A thick noodle is one of any variety of noodles that are deemed to have a relatively large cross-section according to regional cuisine.

 Cumian, from China
 Garak-guksu, from Korea
 Pici, from Tuscany
 Udon, from Japan